The 2009 Buffalo Bulls football team represented the University at Buffalo in the 2009 NCAA Division I FBS college football season.

Notable players
 Naaman Roosevelt, Wide Receiver, 2008 First Team all-MAC.
 James Starks, Running back, 2008 First Team all-MAC.
 Davonte Shannon, Strong Safety, 2008 First Team all-MAC.
 Mike Newton, Free Safety, 2008 Second Team all-MAC.
 Justin Winters, Linebacker, 2008 Third Team all-MAC.

Previous season

2008 was a year of milestones for the UB Bulls: first winning season since rejoining FBS (formerly Division IA), first outright division championship, first conference championship and first bowl game appearance (2009 International Bowl). It was a season of close wins and close losses with six games being decided on the last play or in overtime. UB won four of those games and lost two.

UB stunned observers when they decisively defeated Ball State 42-24 in the 2008 MAC Championship Game.  They went on to lose the International Bowl to Connecticut 38-20.

Head coach Turner Gill signed a contract extension with the Bulls after being courted by Syracuse and Auburn.

Recruiting

Schedule
2009 got off to a bad start for the Bulls as star running back James Starks injured the labrum in his left shoulder in a pre-season scrimmage.  It was determined that he would need surgery and miss the whole year.  Because he was redshirted his first year at UB, he will not be able to play again for the Bulls.

Buffalo's offense struggled to overcome the loss of Starks and the up-and-down play of new starting quarterback Zach Maynard while the defense continued to have a hard time stopping opposing teams and could not generate as many turnovers as they did in 2008.  Buffalo was out of MAC championship contention midway through the season, but did finish with two straight wins on the road.  After the season was over, Turner Gill accepted an offer to coach Kansas.  Gill was replaced by Jeff Quinn.

References

Buffalo
Buffalo Bulls football seasons
Buffalo Bulls football